King of Kensington is a Canadian television sitcom which aired on CBC Television from 1975 to 1980.

Synopsis
Al Waxman starred as Larry King, a convenience store owner in Toronto's Kensington Market who was known for helping friends and neighbours solve problems. His multicultural group of friends consisted of Nestor Best (Ardon Bess), Max (John J. Dee), and Tony "Duke" Zarro (Bob Vinci), who hung around regularly to the perennial disapproval of King's mother Gladys (Helene Winston).

For the first three seasons, Fiona Reid played his wife Cathy. At the end of the third season, Reid decided to leave the series, so Larry and Cathy divorced. Larry then dated Tina (Rosemary Radcliffe) in the fourth season and Gwen Twining (Jayne Eastwood) in the fifth. At the same time, Larry sold the convenience store and took a new job with a youth community centre.

Production
The show was created by Perry Rosemond, who also produced the first season. Other producers included Jack Humphrey (1976–1980) and Joe Partington (1978–1980). The original series pilot starred Paul Hecht and Sandra O'Neill as Larry and Cathy King, although the series was recast with Waxman and Reid by the time the show went into production.

The series featured many Canadian actors as guest stars, including Andrea Martin, Mike Myers, John Candy, Eugene Levy, Dave Thomas, Jeff Wincott and Mark Humphrey. The show was popular with viewers; prior to the start of the fourth season, one of the producers noted the show drew 1.5 to 1.8 million viewers weekly.

The show's gentle but politically conscious humour is seen by some critics as a Canadian version of the topical Norman Lear sitcoms of the 1970s, such as All in the Family and Maude. The series maintained a tight production schedule, with episodes sometimes airing just one week or less after they were filmed, so that topical jokes about current news stories could be incorporated into the scripts.

The series was syndicated to some American stations during the height of its popularity.

After King of Kensington ended in 1980, many of the producers went on to create the new CBC sitcom Hangin' In, while head writer Louis Del Grande went on to create and star in Seeing Things, and Waxman was cast in the American series Cagney & Lacey.

Cast
Al Waxman as Larry King
Helene Winston as Gladys King
Fiona Reid as Cathy King (1975–1978)
Ardon Bess as Nestor Best (1975–1978)
Bob Vinci as Tony "Duke" Zarro (1975–1978)
John J. Dee as Max (1975–1978)
Jayne Eastwood as Gwen Twining (1978–1980)
Peter Boretski as Jack Soble (1978–1980)
Robert Haley as Ron Bacon (1978–1980)
Rosemary Radcliffe as Tina (1978–1980)
Linda Rennhofer as Dorothy (1978–1980)

Episode list

Season 1 (1975–76)

Season 2 (1976–77)

Season 3 (1977–78)

Season 4 (1978–79)

Season 5 (1979–80)

Tributes
In the SCTV episode "CCCP1-Russian television", one of the fake TV programs infiltrating the network is Hey Giorgiy, about "everyone's favorite Cossack", intended as a Russian knockoff of King of Kensington.

In the first episode of the 1990s television series Twitch City, also set in Kensington, the character Nathan (played by Daniel MacIvor) was sent to prison for killing a homeless man with a can of cat food. The producers of Twitch City cast Al Waxman in the role of the murder victim, as a symbolic wink to King of Kensington, although they claimed that they did not intend for the character to be seen as Larry King himself.

In the late 1990s, This Hour Has 22 Minutes featured a sketch detailing the making of a film version of King of Kensington.  In the sketch, director Atom Egoyan (played by Greg Thomey), re-imagines the series as a surreal crime thriller, with Larry King as a serial killer instead of a convenience store owner.

Following Waxman's death on January 18, 2001, a memorial to him was erected in Kensington Market.

In one episode of the Canadian comedy program Puppets Who Kill, the character Bill steals Al Waxman's preserved brain from CBC headquarters.

Home media
On November 13, 2007, Morningstar Entertainment released King of Kensington – Season One on DVD in Region 1.

References

External links 

 King of Kensington Cast Photo and Synopsis
  King of Kensington Episode Guide at TV Archive Site
 

1975 Canadian television series debuts
1980 Canadian television series endings
1970s Canadian sitcoms
1980s Canadian sitcoms
CBC Television original programming
Jewish Canadian culture
Jewish comedy and humor
Kensington Market
Television series about Jews and Judaism
Television shows set in Toronto
Television shows filmed in Toronto
Television series set in shops